Josefa Andrés Barea, is a Spanish politician. From 2009-2014 she served as a Member of the European Parliament, representing Spain for the Spanish Socialist Workers Party

References

1958 births
Living people
Members of the 13th Congress of Deputies (Spain)
MEPs for Spain 2009–2014
21st-century women MEPs for Spain
People from Burjassot
People from Valencia
Spanish Socialist Workers' Party MEPs
Women members of the Congress of Deputies (Spain)
Members of the 14th Congress of Deputies (Spain)